Ålesund sometimes spelled Aalesund in English, is a municipality in Møre og Romsdal County, Norway. It is part of the traditional district of Sunnmøre and the centre of the Ålesund Region. The town of Ålesund is the administrative centre of Ålesund Municipality, as well as the principal shipping town of the Sunnmøre district. The town is a sea port and is noted for its concentration of Art Nouveau architecture. Although sometimes internationally spelled by its older name Aalesund, this spelling is obsolete in Norwegian. However, the local football club Aalesunds FK still carries that spelling, having been founded before the official change.

The  municipality is the 184th largest by area out of the 356 municipalities in Norway. Ålesund is the 13th most populous municipality in Norway with a population of 67,114.

General information

In 1793, the port of Aalesund was granted limited ladested rights. Later, in 1824, it was granted full ladested rights. In 1835, Ålesund had 482 inhabitants. On 1 January 1838, the new formannskapsdistrikt law went into effect, granting limited local self-government to all parishes in Norway. Therefore, on that date, the small ladested of Aalesund became a small municipality with its own council. It was surrounded by the large rural municipality of Borgund. In 1848, it was upgraded to the status of a kjøpstad, a more important market town.

On 1 January 1875, part of Borgund Municipality (population: 902) was transferred to the town of Ålesund. In 1922, another part of Borgund Municipality (population: 1,148) was transferred to the town of Ålesund. During the 1960s, there were many municipal mergers across Norway due to the work of the Schei Committee. On 1 January 1968, most of the neighbouring municipality of Borgund (population: 20,132) was merged with the town of Ålesund. This merger vastly increased the land area of the municipality and more than doubled the population of Ålesund, for a new total population of 38,589. On 1 January 1977, the island of Sula and some small surrounding islets (population: 6,302) were separated from Ålesund to form the new Sula Municipality.

On 1 January 2020, the municipality of Ålesund was greatly enlarged when Haram Municipality, Skodje Municipality, Sandøy Municipality, and Ørskog Municipality were merged with Ålesund to form one large municipality of Ålesund.

Toponymy
A part of the town was originally known as Kaupangen Borgund. The Old Norse word kaupang means "marketplace" or "town", thus the market town for Borgund. The Old Norse form of the current name was Álasund. The first element of that (probably) is the plural genitive case of áll which means "eel" and the last element is sund which means "strait" or "sound".  Before 1921, the name was written Aalesund.

Coat of arms
The coat of arms was granted on 1 April 1898. The red and silver arms show a fishing boat on the water with three fish swimming. The arms symbolize the importance of fishing for Ålesund. The type of ship was typical for the fishing vessels in the 18th and 19th century and is taken from a drawing made in 1762. The waves and three fish were added to the drawing in the arms.

The arms are shown in the Kaffe Hag album with the boat sailing right instead of sailing left.

Churches
The Church of Norway has twelve parishes within the municipality of Ålesund. It is part of the Nordre Sunnmøre prosti (deanery) in the Diocese of Møre. The seat of the deanery is at Ålesund Church.

History

Legend has it that Gangerolf (outside of Norway better known as Rollo), the 10th-century founder of the dynasty of the dukes of Normandy, hailed from the community of Giske, north-west of Ålesund. At least three statues of Rolle exist: in the town park in Ålesund, in the city of Rouen, France, and in Fargo, North Dakota, United States.

In 1835, Ålesund had 482 inhabitants. By 1900, the population had increased to 11,777.

In the night of 23 January 1904, the town was the scene of the Ålesund Fire, one of the most terrible of the many conflagrations to which Norwegian towns, once built largely of wood, have been subjected. Practically the entire town was destroyed during the night, a gale aiding the flames, and the population had to leave the town in the middle of the night with only a few minutes' notice. Only one person died in the fire, the 76-year-old Ane Heen, but more than 10,000 people were left without shelter.

Kaiser Wilhelm of Germany had often been on vacation to Sunnmøre. After the fire, he sent four warships with materials to build temporary shelters and barracks. After a period of planning, the town was rebuilt in stone, brick, and mortar in Jugendstil (Art Nouveau), the architectural style of the time. The structures were designed by approximately 20 master builders and 30 Norwegian architects, most of them educated in Trondheim and Charlottenburg, Berlin, drawing inspiration from all over Europe. To honor Wilhelm, one of the most frequented streets of the town is named after him.

The town has an unusually consistent architecture, most of the buildings having been built between 1904 and 1907. Jugendstilsenteret is a national interpretation centre, visitors can learn more about the town fire, the rebuilding of the town and the Art Nouveau style. Ålesund is a partner in the Art nouveau network, a European network of co-operation created in 1999 for the study, safeguards and development of the Art nouveau.

The term "Little London" was often applied to the community during the occupation of Norway by Nazi Germany due to the Norwegian resistance work that took place here. Among other things, the city was central to the flights to Scotland and England.

Geography

The municipality of Ålesund occupies seven of the outer islands in the county of Møre og Romsdal: Hessa, Aspøya, Nørvøya, Oksenøya, Ellingsøya, Humla, and Tørla. The town centre is located on the islands Aspøya and Nørvøya, while Heissa and Oksnøya contain residential areas.

The second largest island, Ellingsøya, used to be accessible only by boat or by road via Skodje Municipality, but the undersea Ellingsøy Tunnel was built in 1987 to make traveling between the island and the town centre more convenient.

The population of the agglomeration, which includes parts of the neighbouring Sula Municipality, is 48,460. The municipality also contains three smaller separate urban areas on the island of Ellingsøya: Hoffland, Årset, and Myklebost with a total population of 1,279. Other villages include Løvika and Spjelkavik, both on Uksenøya.

Climate
Ålesund has a temperate oceanic climate (Köppen Cfb), also known as a marine west coast climate. The driest season is April- July. The wettest season is September - January, and the wettest month is December. The record low is from January 2010, and the record high is from July 2018. Atlantic lows can sometimes cause warm winter highs in Ålesund due to foehn effect from winds being forced over the mountains in Sunnmørsalpene.

Government
All municipalities in Norway, including Ålesund, are responsible for primary education (through 10th grade), outpatient health services, senior citizen services, unemployment and other social services, zoning, economic development, and municipal roads. The municipality is governed by a municipal council of elected representatives, which in turn elect a mayor.  The municipality falls under the Møre og Romsdal District Court and the Frostating Court of Appeal.

Municipal council
The municipal council of Ålesund is made up of 77 representatives that are elected to four year terms. The party breakdown of the council is as follows:

Mayor
The mayors of Ålesund (incomplete list):
2015–present: Eva Vinje Aurdal (Ap)
2007-2015: Bjørn Tømmerdal (H)
1999-2007: Arve Tonning (H)
1995-1999: Asbjørn Rutgerson (LL)
1994-1995: Asbjørn Måløy (Ap)
1990-1993: Kjell-Arne Slinning (KrF)
1988-1989: Leidulf Dahle (Ap)
1980-1987: Svein Tømmerdal (H)
1978-1979: Olav Helge Balsnes (H)
1976-1977: Johannes Giske (KrF)
1968-1975: Gustav M. Flisnes (DNF)

Economy

The town of Ålesund has the most important fishing harbour in Norway. The town's fishing fleet is one of the most modern in Europe. Ålesund and its surroundings also has a large furniture industry. Some well-known household items are manufactured here. In the 1950s and 1960s, Ålesund was one of the chief stations of the herring fishery business.

In relation to the relatively large fishing fleet belonging to Ålesund and nearby harbours a large shipbuilding and ship equipment industry has evolved. There are not any yards building ships in Ålesund any more, the last shipyard - Liaaen Shipyard evolved into ship repairs and since late 1990s has mainly been serving the offshore industry through the company Liaaen Technology that merged and rebranded to Strata Møre in 2007. In the close by communities however shipyards continue to operate successfully: Vard, Ulstein Verft, Kleven Maritime, Havyard Group.

When oil was found in the North Sea in the 1970s the local fishing fleet ship owners seized the opportunity and rebuilt fishing vessels to serve the infant oil exploration and production industry. Soon they were able to build purpose designed offshore vessels at local shipyards to serve the North Sea oil adventure even better. Today this has become a cornerstone industry in and around Ålesund through leading offshore supply ship owning companies Farstad, Bourbon, Olympic, Havila, and Rem. Serving the ship building industry a large number of equipment manufacturers has evolved: Rolls-Royce, Odim, Sperre, Optimar, Ship Equip, Jets and many more.

To the east of Ålesund lies the Sykkylven Municipality where the Ekornes factory, producing furniture such as the StressLess chair, is located. Håhjem, another village near Ålesund, contains the headquarters of the Stokke company. Ålesund is also one of the harbours at which the Hurtigruten arrives two times per day. As the cultural center of the region and with close proximity to the fjords, Ålesund is a tourist attraction. The Atlanterhavsparken aquarium is another tourist attraction.

Transportation

From Øye at the head of Hjørundfjorden, a road strikes south to the Nordfjorden, and from Maråk on Geirangerfjorden another strikes inland to Otta.

The town's airport, Ålesund Airport, Vigra, has several daily flights to/from Oslo, Bergen, Trondheim, and Copenhagen. It used to have several weekly flights to/from Riga (Riga International Airport) (AirBaltic) and London (London Gatwick Airport) but these routes have since ceased. In November 2012 KLM announced it would fly to Ålesund 5 days a week from Amsterdam starting in April 2013.

Lately, there have been suggestions of a high-speed rail link to Oslo, Bergen, and Trondheim, as well as metro-style local services to meet the needs of the expanding population of the town.

Culture

The Norwegian Centre of Art Nouveau Architecture, Jugendstilsenteret, is situated in Ålesund. It is a museum and interpretive center, with exhibitions telling the story of the town fire and Art Nouveu/Jugendstil in Norway and Europe.

Sunnmøre museum, founded in 1931, is an outdoor folk museum devoted to the Norwegian coastal culture and way of life. Located on an area of 120 hectares (50 acres), it has more than 55 old and distinct houses from the past 300 years moved to the site, replicas of old Viking ships, and the Medieval Age Museum with artifacts from excavations of the old trading centre.

The local newspaper is Sunnmørsposten, founded in 1882 and published six days a week. The newspaper Arbeidernes blad was briefly published in Ålesund in 1898.  Ålesund is the site of the annual Norwegian Food Festival.

Education
Ålesund is home to a sub-division of the Norwegian University of Science and Technology (NTNU), with approximately 1,800 students and 150 employees. The Ålesund School of Art is a school for visual arts located in Ålesund. The Norwegian School of Management had a campus in Ålesund, but it closed on 1 August 2008.

Ålesund videregående skole, also known as Latinskolen, formerly Aalesund Lærd- og Realskole, is the oldest secondary school in Ålesund, having been established in 1863. Of the six upper secondary schools in Ålesund, including Latinskolen, Fagerlia videregående skole is the largest with room for approximately 1,000 students.

Ålesund also features an International school for children aged 5–15.

Gallery

Sport
The local football team, Aalesunds FK (Aalesunds Fotballklubb) was founded in 1914. The team played in the Norwegian top flight for the first time in the 2003 season. The club won its first Norwegian Cup in 2009 and won again in 2011. They played their home matches at Kråmyra Stadium until the 2005 season, when they relocated to the new Color Line Stadium, located approximately  outside the town centre. AaFK's supporter club is called "Stormen" and has about 2,000 members.

Notable residents

Public Service & business 
 Anton Ludvig Alvestad (1883–1956) Mayor of Ålesund, 1920–21 and Govt. minister
 Reinert Torgeirson (1884–1969) a politician, poet, playwright and novelist
 Erik Rolfsen (1905–1992) an architect; urban manager of Oslo, 1947–73
 Monrad Norderval (1902–1976) Bishop of Nord-Hålogaland, 1961–1972
 Dagfinn Flem (1906–1976) politician, Mayor of Ålesund, 1958 to 1965
 Birger Strømsheim (1911–2012) a WWII resistance member and heavy water saboteur
 Margit Johnsen (1913–1987) a Norwegian merchant navy sailor; the only female recipient of the military award St. Olav's Medal with Oak Branch
 Joachim Rønneberg  DSO (1919–2018) an Army officer, broadcaster and WWII Commando
 Rolf B. Wegner (born 1940) lawyer and well known and popular former chief of police
 Helen Bjørnøy (born 1954) a Lutheran minister, politician and County Governor of Buskerud
 Odd Arne Westad FBA, (born 1960) historian specializing in the Cold War
 Edvard Moser (born 1962) psychologist and neuroscientist, winner 2014 Nobel Prize
 Harald T. Nesvik (born 1966) a politician and member of the Storting since 1997
 Paal Kibsgaard (born 1967) a petroleum engineer; chairman and CEO of Schlumberger
 Peder Are Nøstvold Jensen (born 1975) controversial counterjihad blogger known as Fjordman
 Torry Larsen (born 1971) a Norwegian adventurer and Arctic explorer
 Cecilie Skog (born 1974) a professional adventurer, guide and lecturer.
 Sylvi Listhaug (born 1977) a Norwegian politician and Govt. minister
 Erik Tørrissen (born 1988) a Norwegian politician and yachtsman

The Arts 

 Jacob Fjelde (1859–1896) an American sculptor of public monuments
 Ambrosia Tønnesen (1859–1948) the first professional female sculptor in Norway
 Pauline Fjelde (1861–1923) an American painter, embroiderer and textile artist
 Sigvart Høgh-Nilsen (1880–1919) a Norwegian pianist and composer
 Axel Revold (1887–1962) a Norwegian painter, illustrator and academic
 Ole Barman (1897–1983) a novelist, short story writer, playwright and theatre director
 Hartvig Kiran (1911–1978) an author, journalist, songwriter and composer
 Mattis Mathiesen (1924–2010) a Norwegian photographer and film director 
 Arnold Eidslott (1926–2018) poet laureate, 1986 to 2018 and telegraphic engineer
 Arild Rypdal (1934–2015) author of spying stories, a pilot and engineer
 Oddbjørn Blindheim (born 1944) a jazz pianist and dentist
 Svein Olav Blindheim (born 1954) a jazz double bassist, composer and writer
 Geir Rönning (born 1962) a professional singer-songwriter
 Annbjørg Lien (born 1971) a Hardanger fiddler, nyckelharpist, and violinist. 
 Magne Hovden (born 1974) a writer, translator
 Ernst Simon Glaser (born 1975) a classical musician (cello) and music teacher
 Stian Omenås (born 1980) a jazz musician (trumpet), music conductor and composer
 Hilde Marie Kjersem  (born 1981) a jazz and pop singer, musician and songwriter
 Hedvig Mollestad Thomassen (born 1982) a guitarist, vocalist and composer
 Ingrid Helene Håvik (born 1987) songwriter and vocalist, lead singer of Highasakite
 Bjørn Johan Muri (born 1990) a Norwegian pop singer
 Sigrid Solbakk Raabe (born 1996) known as Sigrid, a singer and songwriter

Sport 
 Knud Leonard Knudsen (1879–1954) gymnast, team gold medallist, 1912 Summer Olympics
 Harald Stenvaag (born 1953) rifle shooter, silver and bronze medallist at the 1992 & 2000 Summer Olympics
 Ann Kristin Aarønes (born 1973) former footballer, 111 caps with Norway women
 Ingrid Tørlen (born 1979) a beach volleyball player, competed in the 2004 Summer Olympics
 John Arne Riise (born 1980) a former footballer with 546 club appearances and 110 caps for Norway
 Leni Larsen Kaurin (born 1981) football midfielder, 98 caps for Norway women
 Bjørn Helge Riise (born 1983) a former footballer with 358 club appearances and 35 caps for Norway
 Olav Lundanes (born 1987) orienteering competitor, ten times gold medallist at the World Orienteering Championships
 Nina Haver-Løseth (born 1989) slalom ski racer, team bronze medallist, 2018 Winter Olympics
 Karoline Bjerkeli Grøvdal (born 1990) long-distance runner; competed at the 2012 & 2016 Summer Olympics
 Sebastian Foss Solevåg (born 1991) alpine ski racer, team bronze medallist, 2018 Winter Olympics
 Andrea Raaholt (born 1996) a Norwegian tennis player

In popular culture
Mark Kozelek wrote and performed an eponymous song about Ålesund under the Sun Kil Moon moniker, on the record Admiral Fell Promises.
Ålesund was shown briefly at about the 20:17 mark in the 1969 film, "It's Tough to Be a Bird," by Disney. The town is shown being stepped on by an enormous bird foot.

Twin towns – sister cities

Ålesund is twinned with:

 Akureyri, Iceland (1949)
 Borgo a Mozzano, Italy (1979)
 Lahti, Finland (1947)
 Peterhead, Scotland, United Kingdom (1967)
 Randers, Denmark (1947)
 Tacoma, United States (1986)
 Västerås, Sweden (1947)

See also
 Aalesund ship
 Shetland bus

References

External links

 Municipal fact sheet from Statistics Norway 
 Municipality website 
 Jugendstil Centre/Art Nouveau Centre
 Ålesund Hospital  
 
 Webcam from Ålesund  

 
Municipalities of Møre og Romsdal
1838 establishments in Norway
Populated places established in 1838
Art Nouveau architecture in Norway